The 'Grimes Golden' apple is a cultivar of apple originated in Wellsburg, Virginia (now West Virginia) in 1832 on the farm of Thomas Grimes.

It could be a parent of the famous Golden Delicious apple, and is known to be the maternal parent of 'Yellospur', and the pollen parent of 'Sinta'.

References

Brooke County, West Virginia
American apples
Apple cultivars